Amyntas II, also known as Amyntas "the Little", was king of the ancient Greek kingdom of Macedon for several months around 394/3 BC. He became king in July or August of 394/3 after the death of Aeropus II, but he was soon after assassinated by an Elimieotan nobleman named Derdas and succeeded by Aeropus' son Pausanias.  

He was likely the son of Menelaus, second son of Alexander I, but he could have also been the son of Archelaus. The most influential view, advanced by Historian Nicholas Hammond, is that Archelaus married his younger daughter to Amyntas or Amyntas' son in order to stave off a future power struggle with the line of Menelaus. The argument is based in part on a line from Aelian's Varia Historia about an Amyntas being Menelaus' son. The alternative theory holds that the polygamous Archelaus married his son (Amyntas) to his daughter to cement the branch lines: a half-brother and a half-sister. 

Ptolemy of Aloros, future regent for Perdiccas III, was possibly the son of Amyntas and Archelaus' unnamed daughter. Diodorus simply refers to Ptolemy as a "son of Amyntas," which Hammond argued must mean Amyntas II because all other sons of Amyntas III are accounted for. However, the relevant text is almost universally regarded as corrupt and might actually say “Ptolemy the Alorite fraudulently murdered the son of Amyntas, Alexander.”

When listing the kings of Macedonia, Diodorus omits Amyntas' reign, but all other ancient sources, as well as modern scholars, agree that he ruled before Pausanias.

References

Citations

5th-century BC Macedonian monarchs
5th-century BC rulers
Argead kings of Macedonia